Kyzir Rasim White (born March 24, 1996) is an American football linebacker for the Arizona Cardinals of the National Football League (NFL). He played college football at West Virginia and was drafted by the Los Angeles Chargers in the fourth round of the 2018 NFL Draft.

High school career
White played high school football at Emmaus High School in Pennsylvania's highly-competitive East Penn Conference, where his play was highlighted by MaxPreps and other outlets highlighting top high school prospects.

College career

Following two years at Lackawanna College, White committed to West Virginia, passing on scholarship opportunities from Pittsburgh, Arizona State, Louisville, and Illinois. In his career at West Virginia, he recorded 152 total tackles, four sacks, three interceptions, nine passes defended, and four forced fumbles.

Professional career

Los Angeles Chargers
In the 2018 NFL Draft, White was drafted by the Los Angeles Chargers in the fourth round (119th overall). White was the 11th safety drafted in 2018. 

On May 13, 2018, the Los Angeles Chargers signed White to a four-year, $3.11 million contract that includes a signing bonus of $654,441.

2018

During rookie minicamp, Los Angeles Chargers’ coaching staff announced their decision to move White to linebacker. White adjusted to the new position quickly and immediately impressed coaching staff. During training camp, he began competing as the Chargers' starting weak side linebacker against Jatavis Brown. Head coach Anthony Lynn named White the backup weakside linebacker behind Brown to start the regular season. But an hour before kickoff in the Chargers' season-opener, it was reported Lynn has instead elected to start White alongside Kyle Emanuel and middle linebacker Denzel Perryman.

White made his professional regular season debut and first career start on September 9, 2018 in the Los Angeles Chargers’ season-opener against the Kansas City Chiefs and recorded six combined tackles in their 38–28 loss. On September 16, 2018, White recorded four solo tackles, broke up two passes, and made his first career interception during a 31–20 win at the Buffalo Bills in Week 2. He made his first career interception off a pass thrown by Bills’ rookie quarterback Josh Allen intended for tight end Jason Croom, and returned it for a nine-yard gain in the game's fourth quarter. In a Week 3 game at the Los Angeles Rams, White suffered a knee injury that required minor surgery, and he was inactive for the following four games (Weeks 4–8). On November 3, 2018, the Chargers announced he was being placed on injured reserve.

2019
In Week 5 of the 2019 season, White recorded an interception off Denver Broncos quarterback Joe Flacco in the Chargers' 20–13 loss.

2020
White was placed on the reserve/COVID-19 list by the Chargers on November 21, 2020, and was reactivated on December 9. On December 23, 2020, White was placed on injured reserve.

2021
White entered the 2021 season as the Chargers' starting linebacker and finished the season as the team's leading tackler with 144 tackles, one sack, two forced fumbles, three passes defensed, and two interceptions.

Philadelphia Eagles

2022
On March 26, 2022, White signed a one-year contract, worth up to $5 million, with the Philadelphia Eagles. In White's first season with the Eagles, the team reached Super Bowl LVII, where they lost 38-35 to the Kansas City Chiefs. White had four Super Bowl LVII tackles.

Arizona Cardinals
On March 15, 2023, White signed a two-year contract with the Arizona Cardinals.

Personal life
White has two brothers, Kevin and Ka'Raun, both of whom also played college football at Lackawanna before transferring to West Virginia. White's older brother Kevin is a wide receiver who was drafted by the Chicago Bears in the first round in 2015 and later played with the New Orleans Saints and San Francisco 49ers.

References

External links

Philadelphia Eagles bio
West Virginia Mountaineers bio
Emmaus High School highlights

1996 births
Living people
American football safeties
American football linebackers
Emmaus High School alumni
Los Angeles Chargers players
Philadelphia Eagles players
Players of American football from Pennsylvania
Sportspeople from Lehigh County, Pennsylvania
Sportspeople from the New York metropolitan area
West Virginia Mountaineers football players